Life Fitness is an American fitness company specializing in the production and distribution of cardiovascular and strength training equipment under several brands including Life Fitness, Cybex and Hammer Strength. It is headquartered in Franklin Park, Illinois and is a portfolio company of KPS Capital Partners.

History
Keene P. Dimick created an exercise bike in 1968. In 1977, Augie Nieto incorporated the company in Illinois as Lifecycle, Inc. to sell exercise bikes based on the same name that were based on Dimick's. Nieto sold the company to Bally Total Fitness in 1984, who subsequently renamed the company Life Fitness, Inc.

Life Fitness created the first computerized strength training program in 1988.

In 1991, Bally Total Fitness sold the company to Mancuso & Company, a private equity firm, for $62.5 million. The same year, Life Fitness expanded into treadmills.

Life Fitness was acquired by Brunswick Corporation in June 1997 for $310 million. The sale was completed on July 11, 1997. Later in 1997, Life Fitness bought Hammer Strength, a manufacturing of weight machines.

ParaBody, Inc. was bought by Life Fitness in 1998.

In 2013, Energym Sport purchased the franchise rights for the American brand Life Fitness, for a figure of over one million New Shekel and would start to promote and sell the company's products in Israel.

In 2015, Brunswick Billiards was placed under Life Fitness by its parent company. In addition, Life Fitness created InMovement, a product line for workplaces, and acquired SCIFIT.

In January 2016, Cybex International became part of Life Fitness, following its $195 million acquisition by Life Fitness parent company, Brunswick Corporation. Indoor Cycling Group was also acquired the same year.

In 2019, Brunswick agreed to sell Life Fitness to New York private equity firm KPS Capital Partners for $490 million. The deal moved Brunswick's entire fitness and recreation division — including Brunswick Billiards — into private hands, as Brunswick focused on its remaining portfolio of marine engines and boats. The sale was completed on June 27, 2019.

In 2022, Life Fitness agreed to sell its Brunswick Billiards business unit to Escalade Sports for $32 million.

See also 

 Concept2
 Vacuactivus
 StairMaster

References

1977 establishments in Illinois
Exercise equipment companies
Brunswick Corporation
Manufacturing companies based in Illinois
Rosemont, Illinois
Companies based in Cook County, Illinois
Manufacturing companies established in 1977
American companies established in 1977
Privately held companies based in Illinois
Private equity portfolio companies
1984 mergers and acquisitions
1991 mergers and acquisitions
1997 mergers and acquisitions
2019 mergers and acquisitions